Hosaena (also spelled Hossana) is a town and separate woreda in southern Ethiopia, and the administrative center of the Hadiya Zone. It was part of Limo woreda and is surrounded by it.

A nearby landmark is the rock-hewn Dawabelo Cave, whose rock-hewn pillars suggest that it is an unfinished monolithic church. An all-weather road was built in 1963 by the Gurage Road Association, which connected Hosaena to Addis Ababa by way of Welkite and Endibir. According to the SNNPR's Bureau of Finance and Economic Development,  Hosaena's amenities include digital telephone access, postal service, 24-hour electrical service, a bank and a hospital.

History 
In 1910 Hosaena became the administrative center of the province of Hadiya. The town was occupied by the Italians on 11 February 1937. By 1958 Hosaena was one of 27 places in Ethiopia ranked as First Class Township.

In 1929, a pair of missionaries settled in the town, their efforts leading to Hosaena becoming a center of Protestant Christianity in southern Ethiopia; as early as December 1949, the town hosted a Bible conference, attended by 800 persons. In April 1970, the administrative center of the Kembata Synod of the Mekane Yesus Church was officially moved from Durame to Hosaena; the synod was later renamed the "South Central Synod."

Hosaena currently is one of the nineteen reform cities of the SNNPR.

Demographics 
Based on the 2007 Census conducted by the CSA, this woreda has a total population of 69,995, of whom 35,523 are men and 34,472 women. The majority of the inhabitants were Protestants, with 65.74% of the population reporting that belief, 24.6% practiced Ethiopian Orthodox Christianity, 6.57% were Muslim, and 1.99% were Catholic.

The 1994 national census reported this town had a total population of 31,701 of whom 15,593 were men and 16,108 were women.

Notes 

Populated places in the Southern Nations, Nationalities, and Peoples' Region
Ethiopia
Cities and towns in Ethiopia